Soil biology is the study of microbial and faunal activity and ecology in soil.
Soil life, soil biota, soil fauna, or edaphon is a collective term that encompasses all organisms that spend a significant portion of their life cycle within a soil profile, or at the  soil-litter interface.
These organisms include earthworms, nematodes, protozoa, fungi, bacteria, different arthropods, as well as some reptiles (such as snakes), and species of burrowing mammals like gophers, moles and prairie dogs. Soil biology plays a vital role in determining many soil characteristics. The decomposition of organic matter by soil organisms has an immense influence on soil fertility, plant growth, soil structure, and carbon storage. As a relatively new science, much remains unknown about soil biology and its effect on soil ecosystems.

Overview 
The soil is home to a large proportion of the world's biodiversity. The links between soil organisms and soil functions are complex. The interconnectedness and complexity of this soil ‘food web’ means any appraisal of soil function must necessarily take into account interactions with the living communities that exist within the soil. We know that soil organisms break down organic matter, making nutrients available for uptake by plants and other organisms. The nutrients stored in the bodies of soil organisms prevent nutrient loss by leaching. Microbial exudates act to maintain soil structure, and earthworms are important in bioturbation. However, we find that we don't understand critical aspects about how these populations function and interact. The discovery of glomalin in 1995 indicates that we lack the knowledge to correctly answer some of the most basic questions about the biogeochemical cycle in soils. There is much work ahead to gain a better understanding of the ecological role of soil biological components in the biosphere.

In balanced soil, plants grow in an active and steady environment. The mineral content of the soil and its heartiful structure are important for their well-being, but it is the life in the earth that powers its cycles and provides its fertility. Without the activities of soil organisms,  organic materials would accumulate and litter the soil surface, and there would be no food for plants.
The soil biota includes:
Megafauna: size range - 20 mm upward, e.g. moles, rabbits, and rodents.
Macrofauna: size range - 2 to 20 mm, e.g. woodlice, earthworms, beetles, centipedes, slugs, snails, ants, and harvestmen.
Mesofauna: size range - 100 micrometres to 2 mm, e.g. tardigrades, mites and springtails.
Microfauna and Microflora: size range - 1 to 100 micrometres, e.g. yeasts, bacteria (commonly actinobacteria), fungi, protozoa, roundworms, and rotifers.

Of these, bacteria and fungi play key roles in maintaining a healthy soil. They act as decomposers that break down organic materials to produce detritus and other breakdown products.  Soil detritivores, like earthworms, ingest detritus and decompose it. Saprotrophs, well represented by fungi and bacteria, extract soluble nutrients from delitro.
The ants (macrofaunas) help by breaking down in the same way but they also provide the motion part as they move in their armies. Also the rodents, wood-eaters help the soil to be more absorbent.

Scope  
Soil biology involves work in the following areas:
Modelling of biological processes and population dynamics
Soil biology, physics and chemistry: occurrence of physicochemical parameters and surface properties on biological processes and population behavior
Population biology and molecular ecology: methodological development and contribution to study microbial and faunal populations; diversity and population dynamics; genetic transfers, influence of environmental factors
Community ecology and functioning processes: interactions between organisms and mineral or organic compounds; involvement of such interactions in soil pathogenicity; transformation of mineral and organic compounds, cycling of elements; soil structuration

Complementary disciplinary approaches are necessarily utilized which involve molecular biology, genetics, ecophysiology, biogeography, ecology, soil processes, organic matter, nutrient dynamics and landscape ecology.

Bacteria

Bacteria are single-cell organisms and the most numerous denizens of agriculture, with populations ranging from 100 million to 3 billion in a gram.  They are
capable of very rapid reproduction by binary fission (dividing into two) in favourable conditions. One bacterium is capable of producing 16 million more in just 24 hours. Most soil bacteria live close to plant roots and are often referred to as rhizobacteria. Bacteria live in soil water, including the film of moisture surrounding soil particles, and some are able to swim by means of flagella. The majority of the beneficial soil-dwelling bacteria need oxygen (and are thus termed aerobic bacteria), whilst those that do not require air are referred to as anaerobic, and tend to cause putrefaction of dead organic matter. Aerobic bacteria are most active in a soil that is moist (but
not saturated, as this will deprive aerobic bacteria of the air that they require), and neutral soil pH, and where there is plenty of food (carbohydrates and micronutrients from organic matter) available. Hostile conditions will not completely kill bacteria; rather, the bacteria will stop growing and get into a dormant stage, and those individuals with pro-adaptive mutations may compete better in the new conditions.  Some gram-positive bacteria produce spores in order to wait for more favourable circumstances, and gram-negative bacteria get into a "nonculturable" stage. Bacteria are colonized by persistent viral agents (bacteriophages) that determine gene word order in bacterial host.

From the organic gardener's point of view, the important roles that bacteria play are:

Nitrification

Nitrification is a vital part of the nitrogen cycle, wherein certain bacteria (which manufacture their own carbohydrate supply without using the process of photosynthesis) are able to transform nitrogen in the form of ammonium, which is produced by the decomposition of proteins, into nitrates, which are available to growing plants, and once again converted to proteins.

Nitrogen fixation

In another part of the cycle, the process of nitrogen fixation constantly puts additional nitrogen into biological circulation. This is carried out by free-living nitrogen-fixing bacteria in the soil or water such as Azotobacter, or by those that live in close symbiosis with leguminous plants, such as rhizobia. These bacteria form colonies in nodules they create on the roots of peas, beans, and related species. These are able to convert nitrogen from the atmosphere into nitrogen-containing organic substances.

Denitrification

While nitrogen fixation converts nitrogen from the atmosphere into organic compounds, a series of processes called denitrification returns an approximately equal amount of nitrogen to the atmosphere.  Denitrifying bacteria tend to be anaerobes, or facultatively anaerobes (can alter between the oxygen dependent and oxygen independent types of metabolisms), including Achromobacter and Pseudomonas. The purification process caused by oxygen-free conditions converts nitrates and nitrites in soil into nitrogen gas or into gaseous compounds such as nitrous oxide or nitric oxide. In excess, denitrification can
lead to overall losses of available soil nitrogen and subsequent loss of soil fertility.  However, fixed nitrogen may circulate many times between organisms and the soil
before denitrification returns it to the atmosphere. The diagram above illustrates the nitrogen cycle.

Actinomycetota

Actinomycetota are critical in the decomposition of organic matter and in humus formation. They specialize in breaking down cellulose and lignin along with the tough chitin found on the exoskeletons of insects. Their presence is responsible for the sweet "earthy" aroma associated with a good healthy soil.  They require plenty of air and a pH between 6.0 and 7.5, but are more tolerant of dry conditions than most other bacteria and fungi.

Fungi

A gram of garden soil can contain around one million fungi, such as yeasts and moulds.  Fungi have no chlorophyll, and are not able to photosynthesise. They cannot use atmospheric carbon dioxide as a source of carbon, therefore they are chemo-heterotrophic, meaning that, like animals, they require a chemical source of energy rather than being able to use light as an energy source, as well as organic substrates to get carbon for growth and development.

Many fungi are parasitic, often causing disease to their living host plant, although some have beneficial relationships with living plants, as illustrated below. In terms of soil and humus creation, the most important fungi tend to be saprotrophic; that is, they live on dead or decaying organic matter, thus breaking it down and converting it to forms that are available to the higher plants. A succession of fungi species will colonise the dead matter, beginning with those that use sugars and starches, which are succeeded by those that are able to break down cellulose and lignins.

Fungi spread underground by sending long thin threads known as mycelium throughout the soil; these threads can be observed throughout many soils and compost heaps. From the mycelia the fungi is able to throw up its fruiting bodies, the visible part above the soil (e.g., mushrooms, toadstools, and puffballs), which may contain millions of spores.  When the fruiting body bursts, these spores are dispersed through the air to settle in
fresh environments, and are able to lie dormant for up to years until the right conditions for their activation arise or the right food is made available.

Mycorrhizae

Those fungi that are able to live symbiotically with living plants, creating a relationship that is beneficial to both, are known as Mycorrhizae (from myco meaning fungal and rhiza meaning root).  Plant root hairs are invaded by the mycelia of the mycorrhiza, which lives partly in the soil and partly in the root, and may either cover the length of the root hair as a sheath or be concentrated around its tip. The mycorrhiza obtains the carbohydrates that it requires from the root, in return providing
the plant with nutrients including nitrogen and moisture. Later the plant roots will also absorb the mycelium into its own tissues.

Beneficial mycorrhizal associations are to be found in many of our edible and flowering crops.  Shewell Cooper suggests that these include at least 80% of the brassica and solanum families (including tomatoes and potatoes), as well as the majority of tree species, especially in forest and woodlands. Here the mycorrhizae create a fine underground mesh that extends greatly beyond the limits of the tree's roots, greatly increasing their feeding range and actually causing neighbouring trees to become physically interconnected. The benefits of mycorrhizal relations to their plant partners are not limited to nutrients, but can be essential for plant reproduction.  In situations where little light is able to reach the forest floor, such as the North American pine forests, a young seedling cannot obtain sufficient light to photosynthesise for itself and will not grow properly in a sterile soil. But, if the ground is underlain by a mycorrhizal mat, then the developing seedling will throw down roots that can link with the fungal threads and through them obtain the nutrients it needs, often indirectly obtained from its parents or neighbouring trees.

David Attenborough points out the plant, fungi, animal relationship that creates a "Three way harmonious trio" to be found in forest ecosystems, wherein the plant/fungi symbiosis is enhanced by animals such as the wild boar, deer, mice, or flying squirrel, which feed upon the fungi's fruiting bodies, including truffles, and cause their further spread (Private Life Of Plants, 1995).  A greater understanding of the complex relationships that pervade natural systems is one of the major justifications of the organic gardener, in refraining from the use of artificial chemicals and the damage these might cause.

Recent research has shown that arbuscular mycorrhizal fungi produce glomalin, a protein that binds soil particles and stores both carbon and nitrogen.  These glomalin-related soil proteins are an important part of soil organic matter.

Invertebrates

Soil fauna affect soil formation and soil organic matter dynamically on many spatiotemporal scales. Earthworms, ants and termites mix the soil as they burrow, significantly affecting soil formation. Earthworms ingest soil particles and organic residues, enhancing the availability of plant nutrients in the material that passes through and out of their bodies. By aerating and stirring the soil, and by increasing the stability of soil aggregates, these organisms help to assure the ready infiltration of water. These organisms in the soil also help improve pH levels.  

Ants and termites are often referred to as "Soil engineers" because, when they create their nests, there are several chemical and physical changes made to the soil. Among these changes are increasing the presence of the most essential elements like Carbon, Nitrogen, and phosphorus--elements needed for plant growth.  They also can gather soil particles from differing depths of soil and deposit them in other places, leading to the mixing of soil so it is richer with nutrients and other elements.

Vertebrates

The soil is also important to many mammals. Gophers, moles, prairie dogs, and other burrowing animals rely on this soil for protection and food. The animals even give back to the soil as their burrowing allows more rain, snow and water from ice to enter the soil instead of creating erosion.

Table of soil life
This table includes some familiar types of soil life of soil life, coherent with prevalent taxonomy as used in the linked Wikipedia articles.

See also 

Agricultural soil science
Agroecology
Biogeochemical cycle
Compost
Nitrification
Nitrogen cycle
 Potting soil
Soil food web
Soil microbiology
 Soil science

Notes

References

Bibliography 
 Alexander, 1977, Introduction to Soil Microbiology, 2nd edition,  John Wiley
 Alexander, 1994, Biodegradation and Bioremediation,  Academic Press
 Bardgett, R.D., 2005, The Biology of Soil: A Community and Ecosystem Approach, Oxford University Press
 Burges, A., and Raw, F., 1967, Soil Biology: Academic Press
 Coleman D.C. et al., 2004, Fundamentals of Soil Ecology, 2nd edition, Academic Press
 Coyne, 1999, Soil Microbiology: An Exploratory Approach, Delmar
 Doran, J.W., D.C. Coleman, D.F. Bezdicek and B.A. Stewart. 1994. Defining soil quality for a sustainable environment. Soil Science Society of America Special Publication Number 35, ASA, Madison Wis.
 Paul, P.A. and F.E. Clark. 1996, Soil Microbiology and Biochemistry, 2nd edition, Academic Press
 Richards, 1987, The Microbiology of Terrestrial Ecosystems,  Longman Scientific & Technical
 Sylvia et al., 1998, Principles and Applications of Soil Microbiology, Prentice Hall
 Soil and Water Conservation Society, 2000, Soil Biology Primer.
 Tate, 2000, Soil Microbiology,  2nd edition, John Wiley
 van Elsas et al., 1997, Modern Soil Microbiology, Marcel Dekker
 Wood, 1995, Environmental Soil Biology, 2nd edition,  Blackie A & P
Vats, Rajeev & Sanjeev, Aggarwal. (2019). Impact of termite activity and its effect on soil composition.

External links 
Michigan State University - Soil Ecology and Management: Soil Biology
New South Wales - Soil Biology Basics
University of Minnesota - Soil Biology and Soil Management
 Soil-Net.com A free schools-age educational site, featuring much on soil biology and teaching about soil and its importance.
The real dirt on no-till soil (pdf file)
Why organic fertilizers are a good choice for healthy soil
Effects of transgenic zeaxanthin potatoes on soil quality Biosafety research project funded by the BMBF
Phospholipid fatty-acid analysis protocol A method for analyzing the soil microbial community (pdf file)
 USDA-NRCS - Soil Biology URL accessed on 2006-04-11

 
Soil science